Todor Atanaskov was a Macedonian international footballer.

Career
Atanaskov, known by the name of Svetozar "Toza" Atanacković, was playing in Građanski Skoplje in the Kingdom of Yugoslavia. Građanski was the dominant club of the Skoplje Football Subassociation and Atanaskov got to play on two occasions with Građanski in the Yugoslav Championship where the winners of all subassciations played in order to determine the national champion. Građanski Skoplje managed to qualify twice, in 1935–36 and in 1938–39 Yugoslav Football Championship. Atanaskov played on both occasions, and was the player with most appearances and most goals with Građanski in Yugoslav highest level.

Later, in the season 1939–40, the system changed, and Građanski was placed in the 1939–40 Serbian League but since it finished fifth it failed to qualify to the final tournament. Atanaskov in the 1940–41 Serbian League has scored 8 goals. In total, with Građanski, Atanaskov made 26 appearances and scored 11 goals in the Yugoslav Championship, plus an unknown number of appearances and 12 goals in the Serbian League.

The season 1940–41 was interrupted by the arrival of the Second World War and the Axis invasion of Yugoslavia. Skopje, the city Građanski was based in, was the regional capital of the Vardarska banovina, the southernmost banovina within Yugoslavia, and with the start of the war most of the region was incorporated into Axis-allied Bulgaria. The new Bulgarian authorities decided to merge several of the best clubs from Skopje, namely Građanski, SSK Skoplje, ŽSK, Pobeda Skoplje and Jug, into one which they named FC Makedonia. Most of the players of the new club were former Građanski players, including their coach, Hungarian Illés Spitz. They were immediately included in the 1941 Bulgarian State Football Championship. In the first round they faced Sportklub Plovdiv and they won 2–1 at home, but due to their lack of possibility to travel for the away game, they were attributed a 0–3 defeat, being that way eliminated. In the 1942 Bulgarian State Football Championship however, they entered much better prepared, and after taking revenge over Plovdiv in a single game win by 2–0, they qualified to the quarter-finals where they eliminated favorites ZhsK Sofia by a stunning result of 3–1 and 6–1. The semi-finals were played against Slavia Sofia, a team that by then had already been Bulgarian champion five times, and were the current title holders. Playing in Bulgarian capital Sofia where Slavia was playing at home, Makedonia shocked the audience by defeating the defending champions by 5–1. Slavia did its best in the second game, but their 3–0 win was not enough, and Makedonia qualified to the final with a 5–4 aggregate win. The final was played in two games, both in Sofia, against Levski. Both games were lost by Makedonia, the first one on 11 October 1942, by 0–2, and the second on 18 October, by 0–1. The hero and the scorer of all three goals was Bozhin Laskov. The fact that Levski didn't have to play the semi-finals may have contributed to their players being  much more fresh, while Makedonia players had arrived to the finals after playing many consecutive difficult games is often mentioned by Makedonia players, stuff and enthusiasts as reason why they didn't take the trophy to Skopje that season.

Despite all, Bulgarian Football Union recognised the quality of Makedonia, and after their memorable exhibition in Sofia in the 1942 Bulgarian championship, several of the players were called for the Bulgarian national team. Atanaskov, as one of their best players was obviously one of them. He made two appearances for Bulgarian national team, the first one in Zagreb on 11 April 1942, against Croatia, and the second one in Sofia, on 19 July 1942, against Nazi Germany.

At the end of the war and the defeat of the Axis powers, Atanaskov returned to Yugoslavia which abolished monarchy and retook the territory of the Vardar banovina which Bulgaria had occupied during the war and was now turned much of its Southern parts into the newly formed Socialist Republic of Macedonia, one of the six federal units (socialist republics) forming the newly established SFR Yugoslavia. During the war, Yugoslavia had two factions resisting the Axis invasion, the monarchists and the communists. As the later ones won, they disbanded all major pre-war monarchic clubs and formed new ones which would be identified by the new communist ideology. As a talented footballer, he was brought to Serbia, to the Yugoslav capital Belgrade, and was incorporated into the newly formed side Red Star Belgrade. Under the Serbianized name he used before the war, Svetozar Atanacković, nicknamed by the diminutive either Toza or Todor, Atanacković played with Red Star in the 1946–47 and 1947–48 Yugoslav First League.

References

Year of birth unknown
Bulgarian footballers
Bulgaria international footballers
Association football forwards
Građanski Skoplje players
Red Star Belgrade footballers
Yugoslav First League players
First Professional Football League (Bulgaria) players